Yuriy Brovchenko (born 25 January 1988, in Chernihiv) is a Ukrainian professional footballer.

External links
 
 
 

1988 births
Living people
Footballers from Chernihiv
Ukrainian footballers
Association football midfielders
Ukrainian expatriate footballers
Expatriate footballers in Belarus
FC Dnipro players
FC Dinamo Minsk players
FC Savit Mogilev players
FC Prykarpattia Ivano-Frankivsk (2004) players
FC Krymteplytsia Molodizhne players
FC Bukovyna Chernivtsi players
FC Oleksandriya players
FC Obolon-Brovar Kyiv players
FC Olimpik Donetsk players
SC Dnipro-1 players
FC Obolon-2 Kyiv players
FC Viktoriya Mykolaivka players